Tuelmenna is a hamlet near Dobwalls in Cornwall, England, United Kingdom.

References

Hamlets in Cornwall